Johannes "John" Jacobus Bosman (born 1 February 1965) is a Dutch former professional footballer who played as a striker.

A prolific goalscorer for both club and country, he played professionally for 19 years, most notably with Ajax (five seasons) and Anderlecht (five), surpassing the 100-goal mark with both clubs and winning a total of eight major titles combined.

Nicknamed Bossie, Bosman represented Netherlands at the 1994 World Cup and Euro 1988, helping the national team win the latter tournament.

Club career

Ajax
Born in Bovenkerk, Amstelveen, Bosman began his professional career at AFC Ajax, making his Eredivisie debut on 20 November 1983 at the age of 18 in a 5–2 home win against Roda JC, scoring in the match. He finished his first season with four goals in 14 games.

From 1984 to 1987, Bosman and fellow youth graduate Marco van Basten scored an astonishing 138 league goals combined (48 for Bosman), as the Amsterdam club won the 1985 national championship and two cups. After van Basten left for A.C. Milan in the 1987 summer, he netted 25 goals in 32 games as the team finished second to PSV Eindhoven; he also helped it to the season's UEFA Cup Winners' Cup final, a 0–1 loss to KV Mechelen – the previous year, as Ajax won the competition, he was crowned top scorer with eight goals.

Mechelen
Bosman signed for the Belgian club in the 1988 off-season, reuniting with former Ajax manager Aad de Mos. He scored twice against PSV, in a 3–0 home win in the first leg of the 1988 European Super Cup (eventual 3–1 aggregate success).

Additionally, Bosman netted in double digits in both of his seasons with the Yellow Reds, notably scoring 18 in his first as the team won the national championship after a 41-year wait.

Anderlecht
After one year back in his country with PSV Eindhoven, as successor to Wim Kieft who signed with a team in France – he served mainly as a target player for Romário, but felt uncomfortable in that role, and was also under threat of losing his starting position to youngster Twan Scheepers – Bosman returned to Belgium and joined R.S.C. Anderlecht, reuniting with former Mechelen teammates Graeme Rutjes and Bruno Versavel (and eventually de Mos) and being dubbed "The Giraffe".

In 1996, new manager Johan Boskamp relegated Bosman to the bench, but he was overall a solid contributor in the conquest of three consecutive leagues and the 1993–94 Belgian Cup, his worst league output being six goals in 1994–95.

Later years
Aged 31, Bosman returned to the Netherlands and signed for FC Twente, scoring 20 goals in his first season as the Enschede side finished third and qualified to the UEFA Cup, and being regularly used for the remainder of his spell.

He played a further three years with fellow league club AZ – also signing as a free agent – and finished his professional career at 37 with league totals of 522 games and 241 goals. He retired from football for good after a very brief spell with amateurs Amsterdam FC, later going on to work with Ajax as a striker coach.

International career
Bosman played 30 times for the Netherlands, making his debut on 14 May 1986 in a 1–3 friendly loss in West Germany. He was selected by manager Rinus Michels for the UEFA Euro 1988 tournament, initially as starter, but lost his position after the 0–1 group stage loss against the Soviet Union, his position being taken by former Ajax teammate van Basten, who would be crowned the competition's top scorer as the national team emerged victorious.

Bosman was also picked for the squad that appeared at the 1994 FIFA World Cup in the United States, after Ruud Gullit refused to play for the national team in these World Cup, being an unused squad member.

Bomb incident
Bosman scored nine of his 17 international goals against the same opponent, Cyprus, in three different matches. In a Euro 1988 qualifier on 28 October 1987, in Rotterdam, a homemade bomb or firework exploded in the early stages of the contest close to Cypriot goalkeeper Andreas Charitou; Charitou was stretchered off and replaced, and the Cypriot players left the field in protest and refused to continue playing.

After much pressure from the Dutch side, Luxembourg referee Roger Philippi decided the game could continue. The match ended 8–0 with Bosman establishing a national-team record of five goals in one game, but it was never officially recognised, as UEFA decided that the match was invalid and Cyprus were awarded a 0–3 victory instead, giving Greece the opportunity to qualify; the Dutch made an appeal which carried the risk of exclusion, with Dr. Greep stating that Charitou was not actually injured, which resulted in a replay in Amsterdam.

On 9 December 1987, Netherlands won 4–0 and Bosman netted a hat-trick to see his team through to the final stages in West Germany. Greece were extremely unhappy with the decision, accusing UEFA's West German chairman of preferring a Dutch team in the finals, bringing a larger crowd of supporters to the stadia; after the protests, the Hellenic Football Federation decided to move the last group match to a small stadium in Rhodes and field a sub-standard team – Netherlands also won that game (3–0).

The bomb was hidden in a tennis ball. The thrower was 21-year-old John Staal from Oss, who was immediately arrested.

Career statistics

Club

International

International goals
Scores and results list The Netherlands' goal tally first, score column indicates score after each Bosman goal.

Personal life
In October 2001, Bosman's five-year-old son Devin died in a traffic accident.

Honours
Ajax
Eredivisie: 1984–85
KNVB Cup: 1985–86, 1986–87
UEFA Cup Winners' Cup: 1986–87; runner-up 1987–88 

Mechelen
Belgian First Division A: 1988–89
UEFA Super Cup: 1988

PSV
Eredivisie: 1990–91

Anderlecht
Belgian First Division A: 1992–93, 1993–94, 1994–95
Belgian  Cup: 1993–94
Belgian Super Cup: 1993, 1995

Netherlands
UEFA European Championship: 1988

Individual
UEFA Cup Winners' Cup: Top Scorer 1986–87 (eight goals)

References

External links
Beijen profile 

1965 births
Living people
Sportspeople from Amstelveen
Dutch footballers
Association football forwards
AFC Ajax players
K.V. Mechelen players
PSV Eindhoven players
R.S.C. Anderlecht players
FC Twente players
AZ Alkmaar players
Eredivisie players
Belgian Pro League players
Netherlands international footballers
UEFA Euro 1988 players
1994 FIFA World Cup players
UEFA European Championship-winning players
Dutch expatriate footballers
Expatriate footballers in Belgium
Dutch expatriate sportspeople in Belgium
AFC Ajax non-playing staff
Footballers from North Holland